William Andrew Jackson Sparks (November 19, 1828 – May 7, 1904) was a U.S. Representative from Illinois.

Born near New Albany, Indiana, Sparks moved with his parents to Illinois in 1836.
He attended the public schools and graduated from McKendree College in 1850. He taught school for a time and studied law. He was admitted to the bar in 1851 and commenced practice in Carlyle, Illinois.
United States land receiver for the Edwardsville (Illinois) land office 1853-1856.
He served as member of the State house of representatives in 1856 and 1857.
He served in the State senate in 1863 and 1864.
He served as delegate to the Democratic National Convention in 1868.

Sparks was elected as a Democrat to the Forty-fourth and to the three succeeding Congresses (March 4, 1875 – March 3, 1883).
He served as chairman of the Committee on Expenditures in the Department of the Interior (Forty-fifth Congress), Committee on Military Affairs (Forty-sixth Congress). He did not seek renomination in 1882 and resumed the practice of law.
He was appointed by President Cleveland as Commissioner of the United States General Land Office and served from March 26, 1885, to March 26, 1888.
He resumed the practice of law at Carlyle and Springfield, Illinois.
He died in St. Louis, Missouri, May 7, 1904.
He was interred in St. Mary's Catholic Cemetery, Carlyle, Illinois.

References

External links
 

1828 births
1904 deaths
McKendree University alumni
General Land Office Commissioners
Democratic Party members of the United States House of Representatives from Illinois
Democratic Party members of the Illinois House of Representatives
Democratic Party Illinois state senators
19th-century American politicians
19th-century American lawyers
Illinois lawyers
People from New Albany, Indiana
People from Carlyle, Illinois